Dillwynella lignicola is a species of sea snail, a marine gastropod mollusk in the family Skeneidae.

The epithet "lignicola" means "living on wood".

Description
The height of the shell attains 3.5 mm, its diameter 4.05 mm.

Distribution
This marine species is endemic to New Zealand and is found off the Chatham Islands at depths between 1075 m and 1100 m.

References

 Marshall, B.A. 1988: Skeneidae, Vitrinellidae and Orbitestellidae (Mollusca: Gastropoda) associated with biogenic substrata from bathyal depths off New Zealand and New South Wales. Journal of Natural History 22: 949-1004

External links
 To World Register of Marine Species

lignicola
Gastropods described in 1988